The Old is an epithet that may refer to:

Basarab the Old, Prince of Wallachia in the 1470s
Emund the Old (died 1060), King of Sweden
Gorm the Old (died 958), first historically recognized king of Denmark
Haakon IV of Norway (1204–1263), King of Norway
Mieszko III the Old (c. 1126/27–1202), Duke of Greater Poland and High Duke of Poland
Miro the Elder (died 896), Count of Conflent and of Rosselló
Sigismund I the Old (1467–1548), King of Poland, Grand Duke of Lithuania and Duke of Silesia
William the Old (died 1168), Bishop of Orkney
William V, Marquis of Montferrat (c. 1115–1191)

In mythology:
Aun, Swedish king
Halfdan the Old, in Norse mythology
Harald the Old, King of Scania
Hefeydd, father of Rhiannon in Welsh mythology
Raum the Old, a king in Norway

In fiction:
Bëor, a man in J. R. R. Tolkien's Middle-earth
Thráin the Old, a dwarf in J. R. R. Tolkien's Middle-earth

See also
List of people known as the Young

Lists of people by epithet